The Shadow of the Wind is a 2001 novel by the Spanish writer Carlos Ruiz Zafón and a worldwide bestseller. The book was translated into English in 2004 by Lucia Graves and sold over a million copies in the UK after already achieving success on mainland Europe, topping the Spanish bestseller lists for weeks. It was published in the United States by Penguin Books and in Great Britain by Weidenfeld & Nicolson and Orion Books. It is believed to have sold 15 million copies worldwide, making it one of the best-selling books of all time.

Ruiz Zafón's follow-up, The Angel's Game, is a prequel to The Shadow of the Wind. His third in the series, The Prisoner of Heaven, is the sequel to The Shadow of the Wind.

Plot summary
The novel is actually a story within a story. The novel opens in the 1940's with the protagonist, Daniel, a boy whose father owns a bookshop in Barcelona. One day, his father takes him to the Cemetery of Forgotten books - a secret labyrinthine library that houses rare and banned books. Daniel is drawn to one called "The Shadow of the Wind" by Julian Carax and takes it home with him. Daniel quickly reads and falls in love with the story. He soon discovers that the book's mysterious author, Carax, has gone missing along with every other copy of "The Shadow of the Wind" and most of his other works. Daniel then sets out to find out what happened to the author and his books. 

When word gets around that Daniel possesses the only known copy of "The Shadow of the Wind," he receives an inquiry from Gustavo Barcelo, a rare bookseller and expert on Carax who wishes to purchase it. Daniel refuses to sell it, but soon falls in love with Barcelo's blind niece, Clara, and begins to pay frequent visits to read "The Shadow of the Wind" to her. However, she is several years older and does not reciprocate his feelings. His possession of the book also attracts the attention of a mysterious stranger with a badly burned and disfigured face named Lain Coubert (the name of the character of the devil in the book) who is also trying to get his hands on it. 

Daniel befriends a man who goes by the alias of Fermín Romero de Torres, who was imprisoned and tortured in Montjuïc Castle as a result of his involvement in espionage against the government during the Civil War. After being hired as an assistant in his father's bookshop, he helps Daniel investigate the mystery of Carax. But their probing into the murky past of a number of people who have been either long dead or long forgotten unleashes the dark forces of the murderous Inspector Fumero.

Thus, unravelling a long story that has been buried in the depths of oblivion, Daniel and Fermín come across a love story, the beautiful yet tragic story of Julián and Penélope, both of whom seem to have been missing since 1919—that is, nearly thirty years earlier. Julián, who was the son of the hatter Antoni Fortuny and his wife Sophie Carax, and Penélope Aldaya, the only daughter of the extremely wealthy Don Ricardo Aldaya and his beautiful, narcissistic American wife, developed an instant love for each other. They lived a clandestine relationship only through casual furtive glances and faint smiles for around four years, after which they decided to elope to Paris, unaware that the shadows of misfortune had been closing in on them ever since they had met. The two lovers are doomed to unknown fates just a week before their supposed elopement, which is meticulously planned by Julián's best friend, Miquel Moliner—also the son of a wealthy father. It is eventually revealed that Miquel loved Julián more than any brother and finally sacrificed his own life for him, having already abandoned his desires and his youth for causes of charity and his friend's well-being after his elopement to Paris -- although without Penélope, who never turned up for the rendezvous. 

Penélope's memory keeps burning in Julián's heart, and this eventually forces him to return to Barcelona (in the mid 1930s); however he encounters the harsh truth about Penélope, nothing more than a memory to those who knew her since disappearing in 1919.  Daniel discovers, from the note Nuria Monfort (the wife of the deceased Miquel Molinar) left for him, that Julián and Penélope are actually half-brother and sister; her father had an affair with his mother and Julián was the result. The worst thing he learns is that after Julián left, Penélope's parents imprisoned her because they were ashamed of her committing incest with him and she was pregnant with his child. Penélope gave birth to a son named David Aldaya, who was stillborn. Penélope died in childbirth, due to her parents' ignoring her cries for help, and her body was placed in the family crypt along with her child's. When returning to the Aldaya Mansion, Julián is enraged and embittered by the news of his love's death along with their child's. He hates every wasted second of his life without Penélope and hates his books all the more. He begins to burn all of his novels and calls himself Lain Coubert.

After finishing reading the book, Daniel marries Beatriz "Bea" Aguilar, whom he has loved for a long time and assisted him in his quest to unravel the Carax mystery, in 1956. Soon after, Bea gives birth to a son. Daniel names his son Julián Sempere, in honor of Julián Carax. In 1966, Daniel takes Julián to the Cemetery of Forgotten Books, where The Shadow of the Wind is kept.

Characters
Daniel Sempere Martín (later in the tetralogy referred to as Daniel Sempere Gispert) – The main character of the story. Son of a bookshop owner. After visiting the Cemetery of Forgotten Books and picking out The Shadow of the Wind by Julián Carax, Daniel learns that he should treasure this book because a mysterious figure has been searching for all of Carax's books and subsequently burning them. After reading the book, Daniel becomes obsessed with its elusive author. What he doesn't realize is that there's more to the story than he could ever dream. In the climax, he marries Beatriz and has a son Julián, named after Julián Carax.
Tomás Aguilar – Best friend of Daniel Sempere. Tough and strong, very protective of his sister Bea, and also a rather intelligent inventor. Quiet and shy.
Fermín Romero de Torres – Sidekick, friend, and mentor of Daniel Sempere. After some hard times and several years on the streets, he is assisted by Daniel and Daniel's father, who give him an apartment and a permanent job at the bookshop. He claims to be a former spy who worked for the Generalitat before the war.
Beatriz Aguilar – Love interest of Daniel Sempere and sister of Tomás. Bea, who is a very pretty young woman, is still in school. It is due to her that Daniel and Tomás became friends in the first place because, when the two were schoolboys, Daniel made a joke about Bea that made Tomás start a fight with him. After the blood dried, they became the best of friends. Bea's father and brother are very protective of her, and she has been for several years engaged to marry an army officer, a staunch upholder of the Francoist State. In the climax, she marries Daniel and becomes the mother of Julián Sempere.
Don Gustavo Barceló – Friend of Daniel and his father. An older man who is a book lover and buyer. He originally offers to buy "The Shadow of the Wind" from Daniel, who declines his offer. 
Clara Barceló – Niece of the wealthy Don Gustavo Barceló, very beautiful, yet blind. For several years, the young Daniel comes to her uncle's house to sit and read with her. He develops a schoolboy crush on her even though she is ten years his senior, but tries to forget her once he discovers her in a compromising position with her piano instructor.
Julián Carax – The author of The Shadow of the Wind. Daniel desperately seeks to find out the truth about this mysterious man: the reasons for his journeys, the truth about his childhood, and the explanation for why his books are all being destroyed. Julián falls in love with Penélope at first sight. Their love affair, however, has been doomed since the beginning, because, unknown to them, they are half-brother and sister. After being caught by her parents making love to Penélope, he flees to Paris. After the deaths of Penélope and their son, David, he writes a series of books and eventually disappears without a trace.
Francisco Javier Fumero – The main antagonist. An odd schoolboy friend of Julián Carax who grows up to be a corrupt and murderous police inspector.
Miquel Moliner – A schoolboy friend of Julián Carax, fun-loving and loyal. So much so, in fact, that he sacrifices his own life for Julián's.
Father Fernando Ramos – A schoolboy friend of Julián Carax who later becomes a priest at their old school. He assists Daniel in his quest for the truth about Julián.
Jorge Aldaya – A schoolboy friend of Julián Carax, sometimes rather moody, very wealthy. He is Penélope's older brother, and also Julián's half-brother by their father. He dies in Paris in 1936.
Penélope Aldaya – An ethereal beauty, devoid of anything worldly, she is described as an angel of light. She and Julián fall in love with each other at first sight. It is as if destiny had planned their doomed love, as it is revealed they are half-brother and sister. After she is caught in a tryst with Julián in her  governess, Jacinta's, room, her parents imprison her and discover she is pregnant with Julián's child. She dies after giving birth to David, the son of her and Julián.
Jacinta Coronado – The devoted former governess of Penélope Aldaya, now living in a retirement home. She helps Daniel in his quest.
Nuria Monfort – An intelligent femme fatale who worked at the publishing house where Julián's books were published. She also conducted an affair with Julián while he lived in Paris, and although she falls deeply in love with him he does not reciprocate. Daniel goes to visit her for more information about Julián but later realizes that she fed him lies to protect Julián. She is also the daughter of Mr. Monfort, who holds the keys to the Cemetery of Forgotten Books, where Daniel found "The Shadow of the Wind". She marries Miquel Moliner, Julián's childhood friend.

Critical reception
The novel received mostly positive reviews from literary critics. Stephen King wrote, "If you thought the true gothic novel died with the 19th century, this will change your mind. Shadow is the real deal." Entertainment Weekly assigned the book a grade of A, describing the book as "wondrous" and noting that "there are places in which the book might seem a little over-the-top (doomed love, gruesome murders) but for Zafon's masterful, meticulous plotting and extraordinary control over language". In a Washington Post review, Michael Dirda wrote that it is 

The Guardian considered that "Zafón's novel is atmospheric, beguiling and thoroughly readable, but ultimately lacks the magic its early chapters promise". The San Francisco Chronicle gave the book a negative review, opining that "the combined effect of the foggy setting and soggy writing is of being lost in a swamp."

See also
Tibidabo

References

External links
 Places in the book marked out both on the Barcelona city map and as a Google Earth placemarks file (in English)
 Website about The Shadow of the Wind (in Spanish)
Author's English Website
Author's Spanish Website

The Shadow of the Wind Book Review by Barcelona Life

Novels set during the Spanish Civil War
2001 novels
21st-century Spanish novels
Works set in libraries
Spanish bildungsromans
Spanish-language novels
Novels by Carlos Ruiz Zafón
Novels set in Barcelona
Spanish magic realism novels
Barry Award-winning works
Weidenfeld & Nicolson books
Penguin Books books
Works about reading
Planeta books